Diotima (minor planet designation: 423 Diotima) is one of the larger main-belt asteroids. It is classified as a C-type asteroid and is probably composed of primitive carbonaceous material.

It was discovered by Auguste Charlois on 7 December 1896, in Nice. In the late 1990s, a network of astronomers worldwide gathered lightcurve data that was ultimately used to derive the spin states and shape models of 10 new asteroids, including 423 Diotima. The light curve for this asteroid varies "a lot" depending on the position, with the brightness variations ranging from almost zero to up to 0.2 in magnitude. Dunham (2002) used 15 chords and obtained an estimated size of 171 x 138 km.

Name
Diotima is named for Diotima of Mantinea, a priestess who was one of Socrates's teachers. It is one of seven of Charlois's discoveries that was expressly named by the Astromomisches Rechen-Institut (Astronomical Calculation Institute).

The name is stressed on the penultimate syllable, as in Latin Diotīma.

References

External links 
 
 

Background asteroids
Diotima
Diotima
C-type asteroids (Tholen)
C-type asteroids (SMASS)
18961207